Systena plicata is a species of flea beetle in the family Chrysomelidae. It can be found in the southeast and midwestern states of the United States and in Alachua, Columbia and Okaloosa counties in Florida.

References 

Alticini
Beetles of North America
Beetles described in 1921